Michael Leir (born 1949) is a Canadian former diplomat Leir was High Commissioner to Australia, and he also represented Canada in the following nations: Papua New Guinea, Solomon Islands, Vanuatu, Federated States of Micronesia, Marshall Islands, Palau and Nauru. He served in those roles from 2005 until 2010.

Life and career
Leir received both a Bachelor of Arts and Bachelor of Laws from Dalhousie University, in 1971 and 1974 respectively. He studied for a Masters in Law (International Law) at the University of London in 1975.

He joined the then-Department of External Affairs (now Global Affairs Canada) in 1976 and served in numerous diplomatic positions, including as the lead Canadian lawyer in implementing the North American Free Trade Agreement and the Directors General of United States Relations for the Department of Foreign Affairs and International Trade. Prior to his posting in Australia, he was the Canadian Ambassador to Turkey.

References

1949 births
Living people
Dalhousie University alumni
Schulich School of Law alumni
Alumni of the University of London
High Commissioners of Canada to Australia
High Commissioners of Canada to Papua New Guinea
High Commissioners of Canada to the Solomon Islands
High Commissioners of Canada to Vanuatu
Ambassadors of Canada to the Federated States of Micronesia
Ambassadors of Canada to the Marshall Islands
Ambassadors of Canada to Palau
High Commissioners of Canada to Nauru